Yunga is a rural locality (a village) in Verkh-Invenskoye Rural Settlement, Kudymkarsky District, Perm Krai, Russia. The population was 95 as of 2010. There are 5 streets.

Geography 
Yunga is located 38 km southwest of Kudymkar (the district's administrative centre) by road.

References 

Rural localities in Kudymkarsky District